Charlie and his Orchestra (also referred to as the "Templin band" and "Bruno and His Swinging Tigers") were a Nazi-sponsored German propaganda swing band. Jazz music styles were seen by Nazi authorities as rebellious but, ironically, propaganda minister Joseph Goebbels conceived of using the style in shortwave radio broadcasts aimed initially at the United Kingdom, and later the United States, after the German declaration of war on 11 December 1941.

British listeners heard the band every Wednesday and Saturday at about 9 pm.  The importance of the band in the propaganda war was underscored by a BBC survey released after World War II, which indicated that 26.5 percent of all British listeners had at some point heard programmes from Germany.  The German Propaganda Ministry also distributed their music on 78 rpm records to POW camps and occupied countries.

History

During the 1930s there was a great demand in Germany for jazz music, especially swing (which included elements of the big band sound).  However, such African and American influences were viewed as counter to goals of German racial purity; by 1935 they were outlawed, and the Nazis informally labeled it as Negermusik.  An underground jazz scene, however, persisted in Berlin.  Here bandleader Lutz Templin and drummer Fritz Brocksieper brought together key swing figures of the late 1930s, including singer Karl Schwedler ("Charlie"), clarinetist Kurt Abraham and trombone player Willy Berking.  They escaped notice by pasting pro-German lyrics over sheet music and using instruments like harpsichords for boogie-woogie rhythms.

Goebbels recognized that both art and propaganda were meant to bring about a spiritual mobilization in its audience, and was well aware of the popularity of swing and big band music in Allied countries.  He gave permission to bring Berlin's best jazz musicians into the music-propaganda program, and in 1940 Charlie and his Orchestra was born.

As an official Reichsministerium band, the group made over 90 recordings between March 1941 and February 1943.  Arrangements were by Templin, Willy Berking and Franz Mück, with lyrics written by the Propagandaministerium.  Schwedler was permitted to travel to neutral and occupied countries to collect jazz and dance music, which helped the band and propaganda ministry to produce more recordings.  Outside their "official" duties, many members of the band supplemented their income by playing in underground venues.

By 1943, bombardment by Allied planes took a toll on German broadcast operations; the studio, employees and musicians were moved to southern Germany to perform on the Reichssender Stuttgart radio station.  Even when the city finally came under attack the band played jazz hits live on international shortwave radio, as German domestic stations played the "cuckoo" air-raid warning.

After the war the musicians reorganized under Fritz Brocksieper with the name Freddie Brocksieper, but were still recognized as "Goebbels' band".  They played at US Armed Forces clubs in Stuttgart and Ludwigsburg.  Conductor Lutz Templin became one of the founders of the ARD broadcast network.  Schwedler (in varying accounts) either emigrated to the US in 1960, or became a businessman who retired at Tegernsee.

Style
The purposes of the band were to encourage German sympathies, draw attention to World War II Allied losses, convince listeners that Britain was a pawn for American (and Jewish) interests and convey German dictator Adolf Hitler's messages in an entertaining form.  The songs stressed how badly the war was going for the target audience, and how it would be only a matter of time until they would be defeated.

American swing and popular British songs were initially performed true to the originals until the second or third stanza, when pro-German lyrics and monologues would be introduced.  For example, in the Walter Donaldson hit "You're Driving Me Crazy" Schwedler croons about the confusion of new love; in the third stanza, he continues: "Here is Winston Churchill's latest tear-jerker: Yes, the Germans are driving me crazy / I thought I had brains / But they shot down my planes...".  Later, the entire lyric would be modified (clearly based on the original).  The band also recorded (unaltered) cover versions of popular songs.

Cornelius Ryan's nonfiction book about D-Day, The Longest Day, includes a snippet from Schwedler's cover of Louis Armstrong's 1930s hit "I Double Dare You":
I double dare you to venture a raid.
I double dare you to try and invade.
And if your loud propaganda means half of what it says,
I double dare you to come over here.

Anecdotal accounts indicate that British Prime Minister Winston Churchill enjoyed the broadcasts.

Many of the members of Charlie and his Orchestra went on to successful careers in music after the war.

See also
Lord Haw Haw
Tokyo Rose
Degenerate art
Degenerate music

Swing Kids
Thanks for the Memory

References

External links
 WFMU Radio: Charlie and his Orchestra - includes samples
 Listen online: Charlie and his Orchestra at boomp3.com
 Listen online or download mp3s of ten complete songs: Tennessee Bill's Old Time Radio

Musical groups established in 1940
Swing ensembles
German musical groups
Nazi propaganda organizations